Physospermopsis is a genus of flowering plants belonging to the family Apiaceae.

Its native range is Nepal to Southern Central China and Northern Thailand.

Species:

Physospermopsis alepidioides 
Physospermopsis delavayi 
Physospermopsis handelii 
Physospermopsis muliensis 
Physospermopsis nana 
Physospermopsis obtusiuscula 
Physospermopsis shaniana 
Physospermopsis siamensis

References

Apioideae
Apioideae genera